Darius Clark (April 19, 1798 Weybridge, Addison County, Vermont - January 23, 1871 Canton, St. Lawrence County, New York) was an American physician and politician from New York.

Life
He was the thirteenth and last child of Samuel Clark (b. 1744) and Lucey Clark (b. 1750). He studied medicine at Malone, New York, and commenced practice in Canton, NY, in 1822. He was appointed Postmaster of Canton in 1843. In 1845 he was one of four coroners in St. Lawrence County. He was an Inspector of State Prisons from 1850 to 1855, elected on the Democratic ticket in 1849 and 1852, but defeated for re-election on the Hard ticket in 1855.

References
The New York Civil List compiled by Franklin Benjamin Hough (pages 45 and 419; Weed, Parsons and Co., 1858)
His opinion on the "Showering" torture in Showering and Yoking, in NYT on March 1, 1852
His testimony at a trial for Manslaughter in the Fourth Degree of a man who had killed a girl with cedar oil when attempting to induce an abortion, in Boston Medical and Surgical Journal issued by the Massachusetts Medical Society and the New England Surgical Society (1849; page 478)
 Canton History, at Ray's Place
Medical obituaries: American physicians' biographical notices in selected medical journals before 1907 compiled by Lisabeth M. Holloway, Ernest N. Feind & George N. Holloway (Garland Publishing, 1981) [gives 1870 as deathyear]
American Biographical Notes by Franklin Benjamin Hough (1875) [gives 1798 as birthyear, and 1871 as deathyear]

1798 births
1871 deaths
People from Weybridge, Vermont
People from Canton, New York
New York State Prison Inspectors
19th-century American physicians